Siranga is a part of Kibera slum in Nairobi. Its population is estimated at 150,000 residents. The Nairobi Christian Outreach Centre is in Siranga. Other parts of Kibera include Laini Saba, Lindi, Makina, Kianda, Gatwekera, Soweto East, Kisumu Ndogo, Mugumoini, Makongeni, Kichinjio and Mashimoni.

See also 
Kambi Muru
Raila
Shilanga

References

Suburbs of Nairobi
Slums in Kenya